Gill Mohindepaul Singh, better known by his Chinese stage name Q Bobo, is an Indian–Hong Kong actor working under TVB.

Career
Singh became an actor for TVB after participating in the TVB game show Minutes to Fame hosted by Hacken Lee and Joey Leung. He worked for the Correctional Services Department before becoming an actor.

The first Indian actor signed by TVB, Gill played one of the regular cast on the TVB sitcom Welcome to the House. In an in-depth interview with Muse magazine in 2007, Singh discusses his cultural identity and confesses to seeing himself "like an ambassador for my people".

In July 2012, after the Immigration Department notified that his wife's February 2011 application for naturalisation as a Hong Kong citizen had been rejected, he announced that he would depart from the Hong Kong entertainment industry and emigrate to Scotland. Singh left Hong Kong early 2013 and would not return until 2019, where he began acting for TVB again. As of 2021, Singh has moved back to Scotland to be with his family, as his eldest son was having a child.

Filmography

TV series

Films

References
http://hk-magazine.com/city-living/article/identity-crisis

External links
 Official Blog of Gill Mohinderpaul Singh at Xanga
 
 Gill Singh Mohinderpaul at the Hong Kong Cinemagic
 

1969 births
Hong Kong male actors
Hong Kong male film actors
Hong Kong male television actors
TVB actors
Hong Kong people of Indian descent
Hong Kong people of Punjabi descent
Male actors of Indian descent
Living people
Hong Kong businesspeople
21st-century Hong Kong male actors
Hong Kong male comedians
Hong Kong emigrants to the United Kingdom
Immigrants to Scotland